Ajloun Castle (transliterated: Qalʻat 'Ajloun), medieval name Qalʻat ar-Rabad, is a 12th-century Muslim castle situated in northwestern Jordan. It is placed on a hilltop belonging to the Mount Ajloun district, also known as Jabal 'Auf after a Bedouin tribe which had captured the area in the 12th century. From its high ground the castle was guarding three wadis which descend towards the Jordan Valley. It was built by the Ayyubids in the 12th century and enlarged by the Mamluks in the 13th.

Names
The name 'Ajlun goes back to a Christian monk who lived on this mountain in the Byzantine period.

The castle has been the nucleus of a settlement which has grown to become the present town of Ajloun. The castle's developing faubourg led to its second name, Qalʻat ar-Rabad, "the castle of the faubourg" or "the castle with the suburbs".  This name still resonates in the surname of a large and reputable Christian family owning most of the agricultural lands in the direct vicinity of the castle until this day, the Al-Rabadis.

History

Byzantine monastery

Ajlun Castle is located on the site of an old monastery, traces of which were discovered during archaeological excavations. Tradition has it that the name 'Ajlun goes back to a Byzantine-period monk who lived in the area.

12th-century Ayyubid castle

Purpose
It was rebuilt as a castle in 1184 by Izz al-Din Usama, a general in the army of Saladin. The castle controlled traffic along the road connecting Damascus and Egypt. According to Saladin's historian Baha ad-Din ibn Shaddad, the fortress was primarily built in order to help the authorities in Damascus control the Bedouin tribes of the Jabal 'Auf. These enjoyed enough autonomy as to ally themselves to the Crusaders, and had at one point set up a 100-tent camp next to the Hospitaller castle of Belvoir on the opposite side of the Jordan Valley. As such, Ajlun Castle is one of the very few Muslim fortresses built by the Ayyubids to protect their realm against Crusader incursions, which could come from Beisan or Belvoir in the west and from Karak in the south.

From its location, the fortress dominated a wide stretch of the northern Jordan Valley, controlled the three main passages that led to it (Wadi Kufranjah, Wadi Rajeb and Wadi al-Yabis), and protected the communication routes between southern Jordan and Syria. It was built to contain the progress of the Latin Kingdom, which with the Lordship of  Oultrejordain had gained a foothold in Transjordan, and as a retort to the castle of Belvoir a few miles south of the Sea of Galilee. Another major objective of the fortress was to protect the development and control of the iron mines of Ajlun.

Original outline
The original castle had four corner towers connected by curtain walls and a double gate. Arrow slits were incorporated in the thick walls and it was surrounded by a moat averaging 16 meters (about 52 feet) in width and 12–15 meters (about 40–50 feet) in depth.

13th century: expansion, Mongol destruction, restoration
After Usama's death, the castle was enlarged in AD 1214–15 by Aibak ibn Abdullah, the Mamluk governor. He added a new tower in the southeast corner and built the gate.

The castle lost its military importance after the fall of Karak in AD 1187 to the Ayyubids. In the middle of the 13th century AD, the castle was conceded to Yousef ibn Ayoub, emir of Aleppo and Damascus, who restored the northeastern tower and used the castle as an administrative center.

In 1260 AD, the Mongols destroyed sections of the castle, including its battlements. Soon after the victory of the Mamluks over the Mongols at Ain Jalut, Sultan ad-Dhaher Baibars restored the castle and cleared the fosse. The castle was used as a storehouse for crops and provisions. When Izz ad-Din Aibak was appointed governor, he renovated the castle as indicated by an inscription found in the castle's south-western tower.

Ottoman period
During the Ottoman period, a contingent of fifty soldiers was set inside the castle. During the first quarter of the 17th century, Prince Fakhr ad-Din al-Ma'ni II used it during his fight against Ahmad ibn Tarbay. He supplied the castle with a contingent and provided provisions and ammunition. In 1812, the Swiss traveller Johann Ludwig Burckhardt found the castle inhabited by around forty people.

Earthquakes and restoration
Two major destructive earthquakes struck the castle in 1837 and 1927. Recently, the Department of Antiquities of Jordan has sponsored a program of restoration and consolidation of the walls and has rebuilt the bridge over the fosse.

Tourism
Ajlun castle is open for tourism. Many areas of the castle can be explored. Tourists in Jordan often visit the castle. Inside there is also a museum exhibition with many interesting artifacts from the various time periods of the region.

Gallery

References

Bibliography

External links

 A brief video of the history of Ajloun Castle
 About 50 pictures of the castle inside and out

Buildings and structures completed in 1185
Ayyubid architecture
Castles in Jordan
Mamluk castles
Tourism in Jordan
Ajloun Governorate